Ustanovka was a Russian social enterprise set up in 1924 to provide training and consultancy and to raise funds for the Central Institute of Labour (CIT).

Origins
Ustanovka was set up Alexei Gastev, also founder of the CIT, to provide mass training for the Soviet workforce. It was a development of the work of Frederick Taylor, Henry Gantt and Frank Gilbreth. It aimed to create a new type of employee: "We assert that to reform the contemporary production one must not only reform the organisational process, but also remake the contemporary human employee; we also believe that the best educator of the contemporary employee is the machine". Using highly detailed time and motion studies, each task was broken down into separate elements and then models were developed to integrate these into a rational approach to performing tasks.

With the revival of the Soviet economy in 1924-5, Soviet industry experienced a severe shortage of skilled labour. With the foundation of Ustanovka as a joint stock company, the CIT had a trading arm to provide training and consultancy. Soon they had contracts with the People's Commissariat for Labour and the metalworkers union (in which Gastev had previously played a prominent role) to train 10,000 metal workers. By 1927 they had assets worth over 1,000,000 rubles, eight training bases across the Soviet Union. They had already trained 4,100 workers with capacity to train 6,000 per annum.

References

Social enterprises
Economy of the Soviet Union
1924 establishments in the Soviet Union
Organizations established in 1924